Toodsi may refer to several places in Estonia:
Toodsi, Rõuge Parish, village in Võru County, Estonia
Toodsi, Setomaa Parish, village in Võru County, Estonia